Nikola "Pop" Simić (2 December 1897 – 22 December 1969) was a Serbian football player and manager. He was one of the first "stars" of the first generation of Serbian footballers and played over 100 official matches for BSK Belgrade. He was the coach of the Yugoslav national team in 1936.

Biography
Born in Belgrade, he studied in the School of Theology at Bogoslovija. In 1911 he joined the youth team of BSK Belgrade and later debuted for the first team. In the winter of 1915–16, during World War I he left Serbia in the Serbian army's retreat through Albania. He moved to France where he continued his studies and played in OGC Nice, AS Monaco FC, Olympique de Marseille, Grenoble Foot 38, Olympique Lyonnais and Toulouse FC. He also played half season with Oxford in England.

At the end of the war, he returned to Belgrade, now the capital of the Kingdom of Serbs, Croats and Slovenes (renamed to Yugoslavia in 1929) and rejoined his former team BSK in 1919. He became one of the best players of the Blues, known for his excellent technical skills, and even became team captain. After retiring in 1925, for many years he was member of the club direction.

He played 10 matches for the Belgrade Football Subassociation team, and he was part of the first Yugoslav national team squad which was gathered to play in the 1920 Summer Olympics having played the second match against Egypt on 2 September 1920.

After retiring he was in charge of the football sectioned od BSK in three periods: 1926–1932, 1933–1936 and 1941–1942. He was also the coach of the Belgrade Football Subassociation team, and in 1936 for a short period he was the main coach of the Yugoslav national team.

References

1897 births
1969 deaths
Footballers from Belgrade
Association football midfielders
Serbian footballers
Yugoslav footballers
Yugoslavia international footballers
Olympic footballers of Yugoslavia
Footballers at the 1920 Summer Olympics
OFK Beograd players
OGC Nice players
AS Monaco FC players
Olympique de Marseille players
Grenoble Foot 38 players
Olympique Lyonnais players
Toulouse FC players
Expatriate footballers in France
Expatriate footballers in England
Serbian football managers
Yugoslav football managers